El Vino, also known as El Vino's, is a wine bar and off-licence in London's Fleet Street that was famously patronised by journalists when many national newspapers were based nearby.  It is still patronised by lawyers as the surrounding area is still London's legal district.

The business was founded by the wine merchant Alfred Bower in Mark Lane as Bower and Co. in 1879. That was on the east side of the City of London and, as the business prospered by selling imported Burgundy, claret, and sherry, he opened four more wine bars, including the famous branch in Fleet Street.  In 1923, the business had to change its name, so that Bower could become an alderman, and so it was renamed El Vino – the Spanish name for wine. Bower then became Lord Mayor and the business continued in his family until 2015, when it was sold to the Davy chain of wine bars.

Law
While journalists are not so common in Fleet Street now, the bar is still popular with the barristers and solicitors who work in the surrounding courts and legal offices.  The bar inspired the fictional Pomeroy's in Rumpole of the Bailey and El Vino now has a Rumpole Room to commemorate this.

For much of its history, the bar required male customers to wear ties, and although women customers were permitted, they were not allowed to approach the bar to be served and drink. In 1982 in the case Gill and Coote v El Vino Co Ltd, Tess Gill and Anna Coote successfully challenged El Vino’s ban on women being served at the bar and drinking there rather than having their drinks brought to them at a table; the ban was held to be an illegal violation of the Sex Discrimination Act 1975.

Regulars
Regular characters and patrons included:

 Alan Watkins, political commentator
 Geoffrey Van-Hay, the imposing manager for many years, who kept order with charm and wit
 Ian Fleming who worked in a nearby stockbrokers and subsequently wrote in Mitre Court
 Nigel Dempster, gossip columnist for the Daily Mail
 Peregrine Worsthorne, columnist for the Daily Telegraph
 Paul Johnson, political commentator

References

External links
 El Vino Fleet Street – now one of Davy's wine bars

1879 establishments in England
Wine bars
Pubs in the City of London